Panormus or Panormos was an ancient harbour on the coast of the island of Cephalonia, mentioned by Herodotus.

Its site is located near the modern Fiskardo.

References

Populated places in ancient Cephalonia
Former populated places in Greece
History of Cephalonia